Events in the year 2018 in Cambodia.

Incumbents
 Monarch: Norodom Sihamoni
 Prime Minister: Hun Sen

Events

25 February – 2018 Cambodian Senate election
29 July – The 2018 Cambodian general election resulted in an expected victory for the ruling Cambodian People's Party, who won all 125 seats in the National Assembly.

Deaths

20 March – Kak Channthy, 38, space rock singer.
25 October – Cheam Channy, politician (b. 1961).

References

 
2010s in Cambodia
Years of the 21st century in Cambodia
Cambodia
Cambodia